"Song of Bernadette" is a song written by Jennifer Warnes, Leonard Cohen and Bill Elliott, and  first recorded on Jennifer Warnes' 1986 album Famous Blue Raincoat. The title refers to Bernadette Soubirous, a young French girl in the mid-19th century who claimed to have seen the Virgin Mary on several occasions. She was canonized by the Catholic Church and proclaimed a saint.

Warnes was inspired to write the song on a bus trip near Lourdes:

The song was covered by Bette Midler and opened her 1998 studio album Bathhouse Betty.

Anne Murray included this song on her two CD set released in 1999 called "What a Wonderful World."

The song was performed as a duet by Aaron Neville and Linda Ronstadt on the former's album, The Grand Tour.  The same performers sang it live on Neville's televised Christmas special.

The title is derived from the 1941 novel The Song of Bernadette, by Franz Werfel.

References... 

Leonard Cohen songs
Songs written by Leonard Cohen
Our Lady of Lourdes
Jennifer Warnes songs
Songs based on actual events
Songs written by Jennifer Warnes
1986 songs